The khepresh (ḫprš) was an ancient Egyptian royal headdress. It is also known as the blue crown or war crown. New Kingdom pharaohs are often depicted wearing it in battle, but it was also frequently worn in ceremonies.  While it was once called the war crown by many, modern historians refrain from characterizing it thusly.

No original example of a khepresh has yet been found. Based on ancient artistic representations, some Egyptologists have speculated that the khepresh was made of leather or stiffened cloth covered with a precise arrangement of hundreds of sequins, discs, bosses, or rings. Given that the deshret (red crown) and hedjet (white crown) were apparently woven of some sort of plant fiber, the circles or rings decorating ancient artistic representations of the khepresh may instead indicate the regular array of hexagonal holes in an open triaxial weave. As with many other royal crowns, a uraeus (cobra) was hooked to the front of the khepresh.

History

The Blue Crown, or War Crown, was represented in hieroglyphs.

The earliest known mention of the khepresh is on the stela Cairo JE 59635 [CG 20799] which dates to the reign of pharaoh Neferhotep III, during the Second Intermediate Period. In this and other examples from the same era, the word is written with a determinative that represents the cap crown, a lower and less elaborate type of crown. Images of the khepresh from the reign of Ahmose I, first king of the New Kingdom and the Eighteenth Dynasty, show a headdress that is taller than the cap crown and more angular than later forms of the khepresh. This crown continued to evolve during the early Eighteenth Dynasty, attaining its best-known form in the reigns of Hatshepsut and Thutmose III.

After Amenhotep III's reign – and particularly during the 18th and 19th Dynasties – it came into fashion and was even adopted by some pharaohs as a primary crown. The crown ceased to be depicted in the Kushite Dynasty (747 to 656 BCE).

During the New Kingdom, pharaohs were shown with this crown in military circumstances. However, some scholars think that the crown was also meant to evoke the divine power of the pharaoh, and was thereby worn to religiously situate kings as manifestations of gods on earth.

Gallery

See also 

 Atef – Crown with feathers identified with Osiris
 Deshret – Red Crown of Lower Egypt
 Hedjet – White Crown of Upper Egypt
 Nemes - striped head-dress of pharaohs
 Pschent – Double Crown of Lower & Upper Egypt

References

Egyptian artefact types
Crowns (headgear)
Egyptian hieroglyphs: crowns-dress-staves